The 2009–10 World Series of Poker Circuit is the 6th annual World Series of Poker Circuit.

Event schedule

Notes 

World Series of Poker Circuit
2010 in poker